Dynamo Dushanbe (stylised as ) is a professional football club based in Dushanbe in Tajikistan.

History
The club was founded in 1937 under the name "Dinamo Stalinabad", before changing its name to "Dynamo Dushanbe" in 1971.

In 2007, Dynamo Dushanbe merged with Oriyono Dushanbe, keeping their name.

Domestic history

Continental history

Honours
 Tajik League (1) 1996
SSR Tajikistan League (7) 1937, 1949, 1950, 1951, 1953, 1955, 1958
SSR Tajikistan Cup (12) 1938, 1939, 1940, 1941, 1946, 1949, 1950, 1952, 1953, 1955, 1959, 1971

References

See also
Dynamo FC (disambiguation)

Football clubs in Tajikistan
Dushanbe
Football clubs in Dushanbe
1937 establishments in Tajikistan